Çiçibinə is a village in the municipality of Mazıx (formerly Matsex) in the Zaqatala Rayon of Azerbaijan.

References

Populated places in Zaqatala District